is a Japanese manga series written and illustrated by Haruichi Furudate. It was serialized in Shueisha's shōnen manga magazine Weekly Shōnen Jump from February 2012 to July 2020, with its chapters collected in 45 tankōbon volumes. The story follows Shoyo Hinata, a boy determined to become a great volleyball player despite his small stature.

An anime television series adaptation produced by Production I.G, aired on MBS from April 2014 to September 2014, with 25 episodes. A second season aired from October 2015 to March 2016, with 25 episodes. A third season aired from October 2016 to December 2016, with 10 episodes. A fourth season was announced during the Jump Festa '19 and was released in two cours; the first 13-episode cour aired from January to April 2020, and the second 12-episode cour aired from October to December 2020. The anime film series titled Haikyu!! Final, has been announced, which serves as the finale of the series.

In North America, the manga has been licensed by Viz Media, while the anime series has been licensed for digital and home release by Sentai Filmworks.

Both the manga and anime have been met with positive responses. In 2016, Haikyu!! won the 61st Shogakukan Manga Award for the shōnen category. By August 2022, the manga had over 55 million copies in circulation, making it one of the best-selling manga series.

Plot

Junior high school student, Shoyo Hinata, becomes obsessed with volleyball after catching a glimpse of Karasuno High School playing in Nationals on TV. Of short stature himself, Hinata is inspired by a player the commentators nickname 'The Little Giant', Karasuno's short but talented wing spiker. Though inexperienced, Hinata is athletic and has an impressive vertical jump. He joins his school's volleyball club – only to find he is its sole member, forcing him to spend the next two years trying to convince other students to help him practice.

In the third and final year of junior high, some of Hinata's friends agree to join the club so he can compete in a tournament. In his first official game ever, they suffer a crushing defeat to the team favored to win the tournament – that included third-year Tobio Kageyama, a prodigy setter nicknamed 'The King of the Court' for both his skill and his brutal play style. The two spark a short rivalry, and after the game, Hinata vows to defeat Kageyama in high school.

Hinata studies and is accepted to Karasuno, the same high school the "Little Giant" played for, but is shocked to discover that Kageyama has also chosen to attend Karasuno. Karasuno is revealed to have lost its reputation as a powerhouse school following the era of the Little Giant, often being referred to as 'The Wingless Crows' by other local teams. However, by combining Kageyama's genius setting skills with Hinata's remarkable athleticism, the duo create an explosive new volleyball tactic and develop an unexpected but powerful setter-spiker partnership.

Along the way, Hinata and Kageyama push each other into reaching their full potential, and Hinata develops relationships with his first real team, thus beginning Karasuno's journey of redemption to restore their reputation and make it to the Nationals.

Both Hinata and Kageyama aspire to be professional volleyball players, and make a promise to one another after they graduate from high school that no matter what, they will both play on the same court again. They have a remarkable bond and devote their lives to each other and the sport of volleyball.

Media

Manga

Written and illustrated by Haruichi Furudate, Haikyu!! was initially published as a one-shot in Shueisha's seasonal Jump NEXT! on January 8, 2011. A second one-shot was published in the shōnen manga magazine Weekly Shōnen Jump on April 25, 2011. Haikyu!! started its serialization in Weekly Shōnen Jump on February 20, 2012. In 2019, the manga entered its final arc. The series finished on July 20, 2020. Shueisha collected its chapters in 45 tankōbon volumes, released from June 4, 2012 to November 4, 2020.

At their panel at New York Comic Con, North American publisher Viz Media announced their license of the manga and released the series in 2016. Shueisha began to simulpublish the series in English on the website and app Manga Plus in January 2019.

A spin-off titled , illustrated by Kyōhei Miyajima, was released in Shueisha's Shonen Jump+ website on May 13, 2019. Volumes 2 and 3 were delayed from May 1 to May 13, 2020 due to COVID-19 concerns. Nine volumes have been published as of January 2023.

Radio drama
A radio drama for the series was broadcast in November 2012 on TV Tokyo's Sakiyomi Jum-Bang! program, with multiple voice actors providing voice samples for the characters. It was later distributed in December 2012 via Shueisha's Vomic website.

Anime

An anime television series produced by Production I.G aired from April 6 to September 21, 2014 on MBS, other JNN stations, and with English subtitles on Crunchyroll. From episodes 1-13, the opening theme song is "Imagination" by Spyair, while the ending theme song is "Tenchi Gaeshi" by Nico Touches the Walls. For episodes 14 through 25, the opening is "Ah Yeah" by Sukima Switch, and the ending is "LEO" by Tacica. "Ah Yeah" is also used as the ending for episode 14, which has no opening. The anime has been licensed for digital and home video release by Sentai Filmworks.
 
A second season aired from October 4, 2015 to March 27, 2016. For episodes 1 through 13, the opening theme song is "I'm a Believer" by Spyair, while the ending theme song is "Climber" by Galileo Galilei.
 
A third season, titled , aired from October 8 to December 10, 2016. The opening theme song is "Hikariare" by Burnout Syndromes, while the ending theme song is "Mashi Mashi" by Nico Touches the Walls. Sentai Filmworks has also licensed the third season.
 
A fourth season, titled , was announced at the Jump Festa '19 event, with a "kickoff event" for the new series being held on September 22, 2019. The fourth season premiered on January 11, 2020 on the Super Animeism block. The opening theme is "Phoenix" by Burnout Syndromes and the ending theme is "Kessen Spirit" by CHiCO with HoneyWorks. It ran for 25 episodes, with the first cour running weekly from January 11, 2020 to April 4, 2020; the second cour was supposed to air in July 2020 but was delayed due to the COVID-19 pandemic. The second cour aired from October 3 to December 19, 2020. The opening theme is "Toppakō" by Super Beaver and the ending theme is "One Day" by Spyair. Crunchyroll simulcasted the fourth season.

Original video animations
Four original video animations (OVA) episodes have been released. OVA 1: "The Arrival of Haiba Lev" was released on November 9, 2014, while OVA 2: "VS Failing Grades" was released on May 2, 2016. Two more OVA episodes, OVA 3: "Land vs. Sky" and OVA 4: "The Path of the Ball", adapted the Tokyo Nationals qualifiers story arc from the manga series, and were released on January 22, 2020.

Compilation films
Supplementary compilation films have been released following the airing of the anime. After the first season and before the second season was aired in 2015, two compilation films were released. The first movie, Gekijō-ban Haikyu!! Owari to Hajimari (Haikyu!! the Movie: Ending and Beginning) was released on July 3, 2015 and the second movie, Gekijō-ban Haikyu!! Shōsha to Haisha (Haikyu!! the Movie: Winners and Losers) premiered on September 18, 2015. Two more compilation films were announced after the third season, in March 2017. Both films were released in September: the first film, Haikyu!! Sainō to Sense (Haikyu!! Genius and Sense) on the 15th and the second film, Haikyu!! Concept no Tatakai (Haikyu!! Battle of Concepts) on the 29th.

Anime films
On August 13, 2022, two Haikyu!! Final anime films were announced, serving as the finale of the series.

Video games
Haikyu!! Tsunage! Itadaki no Keshiki was released on the Nintendo 3DS in Japan on September 25, 2014. Haikyu!! Cross Team Match was released on the Nintendo 3DS in Japan on March 3, 2016. Shoyo appears as a support character in the Jump crossover fighting game J-Stars Victory VS for PlayStation 3, PlayStation 4 and PlayStation Vita.

Stage plays

A series of stage plays titled Hyper Projection Engeki: Haikyu!!, directed by Worry Kinoshita, began running in 2015, starring Kenta Suga as Hinata.

Reception

Manga
Haikyu!! received the 61st Shogakukan Manga Award for the shōnen category in 2016. Additionally, the series ranked fourth out of a total of fifteen comics recommended in Honya Club's Zenkoku Shoten'in ga Eranda Osusume Comic 2013 ranking. In November 2014, readers of Da Vinci magazine voted Haikyu!! the 18th Weekly Shōnen Jumps greatest manga series of all time. Haikyu!! ranked fourth on the 2014 "Book of the Year" list by Da Vinci magazine; it ranked sixth in 2015; ninth in 2016; fourth in 2018; 13th in 2019, along with Space Brothers; tenth in 2020; and 18th in 2021. On TV Asahi's Manga Sōsenkyo 2021 poll, in which 150.000 people voted for their top 100 manga series, Haikyu!! ranked eighth.

By December 2016, the manga had over 20 million copies in circulation; it had over 28 million copies in circulation by January 2018; over 33 million copies in circulation by December 2018; over 35 million copies in circulation by December 2019; 38 million copies in circulation by May 2020; over 40 million copies in circulation by August 2020; over 50 million copies in circulation by November 2020; and over 55 million copies in circulation by August 2022.

In Japan, Haikyu!! was the sixth best-selling manga in 2015, and eighth in 2019. It was the fourth best-selling manga series in 2020, with 7,212,099 copies sold. The first volume ranked 22nd on the Tohan charts between June 4 and 10, 2012. The second volume ranked 18th on the charts between August 6 and 12, 2012, and the third volume was also ranked 18th between October 8 and 14, 2012. In December 2016, the 24th volume topped Oricon's Top 10 Weekly Sales chart, selling 282,363 copies in its first three days. During the week of May 11–17, 2020, Haikyu!! was the second best-selling manga on Oricon's Top 10 Weekly Chart, selling 473,858 copies in a week and ranking only below Demon Slayer: Kimetsu no Yaiba.

Leroy Douresseaux of Comic Book Bin praised the story for its in-depth examination of personal and mental struggles in addition to athletic struggles, noting its prominent focus on character drama and team dynamics outside of volleyball.

Anime
In November 2019, Polygon named Haikyu!! one of the best anime of the 2010s, and Crunchyroll listed it in their "Top 100 best anime of the 2010s". IGN also listed Haikyu!! among the best anime series of the 2010s, and nominated it for Best Anime Series of 2016. According to Crunchyroll, Haikyu!! was one of the top 10 streamed anime in the UK, Canada, Oceania, Mexico, and Brazil on their streaming service during the winter 2020 anime season.

The anime was chosen as the favorite sports series in the Funimation 'Decade of Anime' fan polls, where they vote for the favorite anime series through decade in various genres. On Tumblr's 2020 Year in Review, which highlights the largest communities, fandoms, and trends on the platform throughout the year, Haikyu!! ranked second on the Top Anime & Manga Shows category, only behind My Hero Academia. At the 5th Crunchyroll Anime Awards, Shoyo Hinata was awarded "Best Boy" while he was nominated for "Best Protagonist". The fourth season's opening theme, "Phoenix" by Burnout Syndromes, was nominated for "Best Opening Sequence".

Kim Yeon-kyoung, captain of the South Korean National Women's Volleyball team, reacted to and analyzed Karasuno's final rally against Aoba Johsai in season 2, expressing that while a few moments were exaggerated and impossible to do in real life, she was pleasantly surprised by its portrayal of high-level volleyball and thought it was "fun to watch". She noted that the creator "is a person with a high level of volleyball knowledge".

Melina Dargis of The Fandom Post praised its development of a team mentality with multiple characters rather than individuals, serving to emphasize that volleyball "... is not an individual event, but a team sport". Noelle Ogawa of Crunchyroll praised it for its portrayal of personal growth, emphasizing its dependence on having the "right people and the right environment to bloom in." Rebecca Silverman of Anime News Network commented on the development of non-players like Karasuno's team manager, Kiyoko, stating that "her triumphant jump as she brings Hinata his lost sneakers is a beautiful statement of the fact that she's just as much a part of the team as any of the boys". Silverman also comments on the anime's attention to detail, noting the inclusion of deep breaths in, the movement of muscles in player's legs, and point of view shots that follow the ball during rallies. Isaac Ackers applauded the anime for its creation of intensity without having to use the speed of real-life sports, noting that it "[tightens] its focus on individual moments, making each point a peak and each second leading up to those peaks essential. Instead of speeding up, it slows down. It hangs on specific plays, stretches out the time the volleyball is in the air, emphasizes the moments in between. It’s simple, but it’s sublimely effective."

Rafael Motamayor of Slash Film commended the anime, stating that "the best part of Haikyu!! is the way the show integrates relationships and character stories into the actual sport", noting that "what may look like a simple toss suddenly turns into a vital lesson in building trust with your teammates, and the planning and staging of a spike also means addressing and confronting years of self-hatred and doubts". He also complimented the combination of Production I.G's fluid animation and Yuki Hayashi's soundtrack, which "[elevate] a simple game into an operatic duel of fates", with "visual metaphors that [turn] every pass into a battle". Guillermo Kurten of Comic Book Resources praised Haikyu!! for its outstanding characterization and for its execution of an entertaining story, even for those who do not enjoy sports or have no volleyball knowledge. K. Thor Jensen of Mashable listed it on his list of the best sports anime.

Notes

References

External links
  
  
  
 
 

Haikyu!!
2012 manga
2014 anime television series debuts
2015 anime television series debuts
2016 anime television series debuts
2020 anime television series debuts
Anime series based on manga
Animeism
Comedy anime and manga
Coming-of-age anime and manga
Madman Entertainment anime
Mainichi Broadcasting System original programming
Medialink
Production I.G
School life in anime and manga
Sentai Filmworks
Shōnen manga
Shueisha franchises
Shueisha manga
Television shows set in Miyagi Prefecture
Toho Animation
Viz Media manga
Volleyball in anime and manga
Winners of the Shogakukan Manga Award for shōnen manga